Michael Woodcock (born 10 April 1943) is  a former British Conservative Party politician. He was the Member of Parliament (MP) for Ellesmere Port and Neston from 1983 to 1992. He was first elected at the 1983 general election, and was re-elected at the 1987 general election. Woodcock stood down at the 1992 general election, following which his seat was won by Labour's Andrew Miller.

References
Times Guide to the House of Commons 1987

External links 
 

1943 births
Living people
Conservative Party (UK) MPs for English constituencies
UK MPs 1983–1987
UK MPs 1987–1992